Naozumi (written: 直純 or 直澄) is a masculine Japanese given name. Notable people with the name include:

, Japanese noble
, Japanese daimyō
, Japanese singer and voice actor

Japanese masculine given names